203rd Infantry Brigade may refer to:

 203rd (2nd North Wales) Brigade British Army formation in World War I
 203rd Independent Infantry Brigade (Home) British Army formation in World War II
 203rd Infantry Brigade (United Kingdom) British Army formation in World War II